The War within Us is the second studio album from Onward to Olympas. Facedown Records released the album on March 15, 2011. Onward to Olympas worked with Jamie King, in the production of this album.

Critical reception

Rating the album an eight out of ten for Cross Rhythms, Peter John Willoughby writes, "It would be easy to define this simply as metalcore, but it also contains punishing double bass, balanced breakdowns, blast beats and heavy guitar grooves." Scott Fryberger, awarding the album four stars from Jesus Freak Hideout, states, "The War Within Us is certainly not a perfect album ... but Onward To Olympas has some more goodness on their hands. Metalheads will enjoy this, no doubt." Giving the album four stars at Indie Vision Music, Steve says, "This is an extremely solid album from an up and coming band." Jen Rochester, awarding the album four and a half stars by The New Review, describes, "While the album might not be perfect, I’m hard-pressed to come up with anything significant that I don’t like about it. Hopefully this album will help garner the attention these guys deserve." Brian Morrissette, giving the album five stars for Christ Core, says, "Excellent Spirit-filled metalcore containing powerful lyrics and all-around great music."

Signaling in a three star review from HM Magazine, Tim Harris describes, "Onward to Olympas are trying to find themselves ... The album walks a thin line from metalcore to oldschool hardcore, while mixing in some clean vocals and even a softer praise song." Sebastian Fonseca, specifying in a 4.5 out of ten review for Mind Equals Blown, writes, "Onward to Olympas is one of the latest of cases in the metalcore scene of bands that simply fall victim to the plague of misdirection. The War Within Us is an example of what happens when a band tries to do more than one thing at a time ... The War Within Us is an album you can spin a couple of times, if you’re a fan of the genre, but even then a couple of spins is probably the most you’ll get out of this record."

Track listing

Credits
Onward To Olympas
 Justin Allman - Bass
 Kramer Lowe - Vocals
 Nick Helvey - Drums
 Andrew Higginbotham - Guitar
 Andy Simmons - Guitar, Vocals

Additional Musicians
 Justin Gage - Vocals
 Ashleigh Higginbotham - Vocals

Production
 Burak 'Loomis The Turk' Erin - Management
 Josh Deaton - Photography
 Jamie King - Engineer, Mastering, Mixing, Producer
 David Morrison - Booking
 Ryan Nelson - Management
 Dave Quiggle - Artwork

References

2011 albums
Facedown Records albums
Onward to Olympas albums
Albums produced by Jamie King (record producer)